Pound for pound is a ranking used in combat sports, such as boxing, wrestling, or mixed martial arts, of who the better fighters are irrespective of their weight, i.e. adjusted to compensate for weight class. As these fighters do not compete directly, judging the best fighter pound for pound is subjective, and ratings vary. They may be based on a range of criteria including "quality of opposition" and factors such as how exciting the fighter is or how famous they are, or be an attempt to determine who would win if all those ranked were the same size.

Boxing

In boxing, the term was historically associated with fighters such as Benny Leonard and Sugar Ray Robinson who were widely considered to be the most skilled fighters of their day, to distinguish them from the generally more popular (and better compensated) heavyweight champions. Since 1990, The Ring magazine has maintained a pound for pound ranking of fighters.

Mixed martial arts

Some mixed martial arts promotions have pound-for-pound rankings, including Ultimate Fighting Championship since 2013, ONE Championship since 2020, and Bellator MMA since 2021. There are also multiple unofficial MMA pound-for-pound rankings, including by ESPN.com, Sherdog, Fight Matrix, MMA Fighting and Tapology.

Kickboxing / Muay Thai

ONE Championship publishes pound-for-pound rankings for kickboxing and Muay Thai since 2020. Combat Press and Beyond Kick also publish pound-for-pound rankings for kickboxing.

References

External links

Combat sports
Metrics
Terminology used in multiple sports
Boxing terminology
Kickboxing terminology
Martial arts terminology